A Little Learning: The First Volume of an Autobiography (1964) is Evelyn Waugh's unfinished autobiography. It was published just two years before his death on Easter Sunday, 1966, and covers the period of his youth and education.  The title is a well-known quotation from Pope's An Essay on Criticism, "A little learning is a dang'rous thing".

Footnotes

References

1964 non-fiction books
Books by Evelyn Waugh
Literary autobiographies
Unfinished books
Chapman & Hall books